This is a list of the 160 resident embassies in Paris. For other diplomatic missions in France, see List of diplomatic missions in France.

Embassies in Paris

Consulates-General in Paris

Other missions or delegations in Paris

Official Residences

See also 
 Foreign relations of France
 List of diplomatic missions in France

References 

 
France
Diplomatic missions
diplomatic missions